Choichi Terukina (Japanese: 照喜名朝一, Terukina Chōichi, 15 April 1932 – 10 September 2022) was a Japanese Ryukyuan classical musician and sanshin grandmaster.

Early life 
Terukina was born in Okinawa on 15 April 1932. When he was 6 years old, he started playing the sanshin, an Okinawan three-stringed instrument. At age 25, Terukina started formal sanshin lessons under Haruyuki Miyazato, a sanshin master. Miyazato's lessons relied more on imitating the teacher's music rather than reading off of musical notes, which is an essential part of uta-sanshin, the style of playing that Terukina taught.

Career 
In 1960, Terukina opened his first sanshin dojo, teaching students the Afuso Ryu style of uta-sanshin. He has taught hundreds of students throughout his career as a sanshin grandmaster. In 2000, Terukina was designated as a Living National Treasure of Japan for his mastery of Ryukyuan classical music (koten).

Terukina was the leader of the organization Ryukyu Koten Afuso-ryu Ongaku Kenkyuu Choichi Kai, which has 1,300 members worldwide.

Terukina played at Carnegie Hall in 2019. This was for his 88th lunar birthday, which is a special date in the Okinawan culture known as beiju.

Personal life and death
Terukina had a son named Tomokuni, who also plays the sanshin. Choichi Terukina died at his home in Naha City on 10 September 2022, at the age of 90.

References

External links
 

1932 births
2022 deaths
Japanese classical musicians
Living National Treasures of Japan
People from Okinawa Prefecture
Ryukyuan people